Hughes Creek may refer to:

Hughes Creek (Apple Creek), a stream in Missouri
Hughes Creek (Washington County, Missouri), a stream in Missouri
Hughes Creek (West Virginia), a stream in West Virginia